The following is a list of Australian television ratings for the year 1998.

Network Shares 

* Data Gathered by then Ratings Supplier: A.C Neilsen Australia

Highest Rating Programs

Top Rating Regular Programmes

Weeknight News and Current Affair Readers 1998 
List of Australian TV news presenters year by year#1990%E2%80%931999

See also

Television ratings in Australia

References

1998
1998 in Australian television